Wire on the Box: 1979 is a live album and DVD by English rock band Wire. Whilst recorded in 1979, it was released on 4 October 2004 as the first in a series of archival releases on Wire's own Pinkflag label. It features the complete live television recording for the German Rockpalast music television show, broadcast by Westdeutscher Rundfunk (WDR). The live set consists largely of tracks from 1978's Chairs Missing and the then-yet-to-be-released 154, and is the second live recording to be released from Wire's original phase since 1981's Document and Eyewitness.

Background 
Wire performed on Rockpalast at the invitation of Alan Bangs, a German-based British disc jockey and radio/TV presenter. "What's remarkable about it was that it took a Brit living in Germany to get Wire on the telly. Nobody in Britain would do it at the time," Wire's Colin Newman said in 2012. "He put us on when The Old Grey Whistle Test wouldn't have us ... and if it wasn't for that there'd be no serious visual record of us playing in the 70s. For that, we're really grateful."

The Rockpalast recording was released by Wire themselves after being in the WDR archive for years. The band discovered that "as artists you have the legal rights to release it - another company couldn't, but the artist could," Newman said.

Critical reception 

AllMusic found Wire's performance to be "energetic and dynamic," writing, "On the Box catches Wire at the height of its powers and this material still sounds remarkably fresh." Pitchfork also noted the band's "energy and passion" as well as being "tight, focused, even demented in their intensity at times." They described the performance as "spot-on" with a "spectacularly clear" sound. 

The Austin Chronicle was less positive, feeling that "without the bold psychedelic flourishes of the Mike Thorne-produced Chairs Missing, ... this rather skeletal set rings hollow." They felt, however, that the band's performance on the release "brims with punch and fire ... and with decent fidelity to boot."

Track listing

Personnel 
 Wire
 Colin Newman – guitar, vocals
 Graham Lewis – bass, vocals
 Bruce Gilbert – guitar
 Robert Gotobed – drums 

 Production
 Alan Bangs – DVD interview
 Denis Blackham – remastering
 David Coppenhall – design

References

External links 

 

Wire (band) live albums
2004 live albums
Self-released albums
2004 video albums
Live video albums
Wire (band) video albums